This is a list of the 56 members of the House of Representatives of Cyprus, following the 2016 legislative election.

List of voting members

Sources
Biographical notes – Parliament of Cyprus

Politics of Cyprus
Lists of members of the House of Representatives (Cyprus)